Lipkea ruspoliana is a species of stalked jellyfish. Lipkea species lack tentacles at the end of their bell.

References

Lipkeidae